"Night of the Meek" is the first segment of the thirteenth episode from the first season (1985–86) from the television series The Twilight Zone. It is a remake of the original The Twilight Zone series episode, "The Night of the Meek", about a drunken department store Santa (played by Richard Mulligan) who finds a magical sack that can create presents and becomes a real-life Santa Claus. The title is almost unchanged from the original episode, even though the monologue from which the title was derived was replaced.

Plot
On Christmas Eve Henry Corwin, a department store Santa Claus, takes his dinner break at a local bar, complaining to the bartender that many children will not have presents for Christmas, and wishes he had more money left to spend on alcoholic drinks. Without explanation, two dollar bills appear out of Corwin's pocket. Rather than resume drinking, he donates them to two homeless children outside.

When Corwin returns to work tipsy, the store owner Mr. Dundee fires him. Dundee is already upset that the custom-made coat for his wife was sold to a customer and rebukes Corwin for disappointing the children who were waiting to see him. Corwin says that the kids whose families struggle with keeping the lights on and putting food on their tables will be the ones disappointed. Depressed, Corwin goes to his apartment. He hears children caroling and says that he wishes that he had something to give them. As he takes out the garbage, toys spill out of the garbage bag.

Mr. Dundee is driving home and finds the road obstructed due to a massive party centered in the lobby of Corwin's tenement building. Corwin is giving each person whatever they want most for Christmas, in some cases without their specifically asking for it, by pulling it out of the garbage bag. Mr. Dundee suspects the items were stolen from his department store. The police interrogate Corwin. Since Corwin cannot explain where the gifts came from, they decide to confiscate all the gifts and take Corwin to the station. Before they can, receipts flow out of the bag, and the police are satisfied everything was acquired honestly.

Dundee confronts Corwin privately afterwards, having come to believe that he produced the items through a miracle. Reaching into the bag, Corwin pulls out the fur coat intended for Mrs. Dundee and a baseball with the signatures of the 1961 Yankees for Mr. Dundee. Overjoyed, Dundee asks Henry if there is anything that he would like for Christmas. Corwin says that all he wants is to be able to be charitable every year and enters his apartment. Corwin attempts to get his beard and mustache off but finds they are now real. Realizing he has become Santa Claus, Corwin disappears up the chimney. Near his car, Dundee hears bells and a jolly laugh overhead and knows that Corwin got his wish.

References

External links
 

1985 American television episodes
The Twilight Zone (1985 TV series season 1) episodes
Santa Claus in television
Television remakes

fr:Croyez-vous encore au Père Noël ?